King's Chapel Burying Ground is a historic graveyard on Tremont Street, near its intersection with School Street, in Boston, Massachusetts. Established in 1630, it is the oldest graveyard in the city and is a site on the Freedom Trail.  Despite its name, the graveyard pre-dates the adjacent King's Chapel (whose first structure was built in 1688); it is not affiliated to that or any other church.

History
King's Chapel Burying Ground was founded in 1630 as the first graveyard in the city of Boston. According to custom, the first interment was that of the land's original owner, Isaac Johnson. It was Boston's only burial site for 30 years (1630–1660). After being unable to locate land elsewhere, in 1686 the newly established local Anglican congregation was allotted land in the graveyard to build King's Chapel.

Today there are 505 headstones and 59 footstones remaining from the more than one thousand people buried in the small space since its inception. There are also 78 tombs, of which 36 have markers. This includes the large vault, built as a charnel house, which was converted into a tomb for children's remains in 1833. The earliest tombs are scattered among the grave markers. Most are in tabletop form.

Notable burials
 Charles Apthorp, merchant, slave trader
 Francis Brinley, American landowner, government official, philanthropist and military officer
 Mary Chilton, Plymouth Pilgrim, first European woman to step ashore in New England
 Captain Roger Clapp, member of the Ancient and Honorable Artillery Company of Massachusetts, died February 2, 1691, formerly lived at Dorchester (Capt. Clapp's son Desire is also interred close by)
 John Cotton, Puritan theologian
 John Davenport, Puritan theologian
 William Dawes (disputed), American Revolution hero
 William Emerson (father of Ralph Waldo Emerson)
 Robert Keayne, first captain of the Ancient and Honorable Artillery Company of Massachusetts
 John Leverett, colonial governor of Massachusetts
 John Oxenbridge, Puritan theologian
 Elizabeth Pain, whose headstone is apocryphally claimed to be the inspiration for Hester Prynne's in The Scarlet Letter
 Major Thomas Savage, distinguished settler and soldier, son-in-law of Ann Hutchinson
 Frederic Tudor, Boston's "Ice King"
 Hezekiah Usher, first bookseller and book publisher in the British Colonies
 John Wilson Puritan theologian
 John Winthrop, first Puritan governor of Massachusetts

Image gallery

See also
 List of cemeteries in Boston, Massachusetts

References

External links

 

1630 establishments in Massachusetts
Cemeteries in Boston
Cemeteries established in the 17th century